Photoplay Productions is an independent film company, based in the UK, under the direction of Kevin Brownlow and Patrick Stanbury. Is one of the few independent companies to operate in the revival of interest in the lost world of silent cinema and has been recognised as a driving force in the subject.

In 2010, Photoplay Productions was the recipient of the Silent Film Festival Award

Documentary production
Photoplay Productions has been recognised as a driving force in the revival of interest in the lost world of silent cinema.

Amongst its film history documentaries are:

 D. W. Griffith: Father of Film, produced by Kevin Brownlow, David Gilll and Patrick Stanbury. Narrated by Sam Wanamaker.
 I'm King Kong! - The Exploits of Merian C Cooper (2005) directed by Kevin Brownlow and Christopher Bird. Narrated by Alec Baldwin
 Garbo (2005) directed by Kevin Brownlow and Christopher Bird. Narrated by Julie Christie
 Cinema Europe: The Other Hollywood (1995) directed by Kevin Brownlow and David Gill. Narrated by Kenneth Branagh
 Universal Horror (1998) directed by Kevin Brownlow. Narrated by Kenneth Branagh
 The Tramp and the Dictator (2002) directed by Kevin Brownlow and Michael Kloft. Narrated by Kenneth Branagh
 Cecil B. DeMille - American Epic (2003) directed by Kevin Brownlow directed by Kevin Brownlow. Narrated by Kenneth Branagh
 Lon Chaney - A Thousand Faces (2000) directed by Kevin Brownlow Narrated by Kenneth Branagh
 So Funny It Hurt – Buster Keaton And MGM (2004) directed by Kevin Brownlow and Christopher Bird. Narrated by James Karen
 Abel Gance – The Charm of Dynamite (1968) directed by Kevin Brownlow. Narrated by Lindsay Anderson

Selected film restoration
Photoplay Productions has restored numerous feature silent films and shorts, with music by Carl Davis including the following titles:

Features
 Napoleon (1927) directed by Abel Gance starring Albert Dieudonné
 The Birth of a Nation (1915) directed by D. W. Griffith starring Lillian Gish and Henry B Walthall
 Greed (1924) directed by Eric Von Stroheim with ZaSu Pitts and Gibson Gowland
 Nosferatu (1922) directed by F. W. Murnau starring Max Schreck
 It (1927) directed by Clarence Badger starring Clara Bow
 Old Heidelberg (1927) directed by Ernst Lubitsch starring Ramon Novarro and Norma Shearer
 Sunrise: A Song of Two Humans (1927) directed by F. W. Murnau starring Janet Gaynor and George O'Brien
 Flesh and the Devil (1926) directed by Clarence Brown with Greta Garbo and John Gilbert
 The Mysterious Lady (1928) directed by Fred Niblo starring Greta Garbo and Conrad Nagel
 A Woman of Affairs (1928) directed by Clarence Brown starring Greta Garbo and John Gilbert
 The Blot (1921) directed by Lois Weber starring Claire Windsor and Louis Calhern
 The Crowd (1928) directed by King Vidor starring Eleanor Boardman and James Murray
 La Terre (1919) directed by André Antoine starring Germaine Rouer and Armand Bour
 The Yellow Ticket (1918) directed by Victor Jansen starring Pola Negri
 The Godless Girl (1928) directed by Cecil B. DeMille
 The Wind (1928) directed by Victor Seastrom with Lillian Gish and Lars Hanson
 The Wedding March (1928) starring Erich von Stroheim with Fay Wray
 The Iron Mask (1929) directed by Allan Dwan starring Douglas Fairbanks
 The Thief of Bagdad (1924) directed by Raoul Walsh starring Douglas Fairbanks
 The Eagle (1925) directed by Clarence Brown with Rudolph Valentino and Vilma Banky
 The Four Horsemen of the Apocalypse (1921) by Rex Ingram with Rudolph Valentino
 The Big Parade (1925) directed by King Vidor starring John Gilbert and Renee Adoree
 Wings (1927) directed by William Wellman starring Clara Bow, Richard Arlen and Charles "Buddy" Rogers
 The Chess Player (1926) directed by Raymond Bernard starring Pierre Blanchar and Edith Jehanne
 Orphans of the Storm (1921) directed by D. W. Griffith starring Lillian and Dorothy Gish
 Show People (1928) by King Vidor with Marion Davies and William Haines
 The Iron Horse (1924) directed by John Ford starring George O 'Brien and Madge Bellamy
 The Extra Girl (1923) with Mabel Normand
 Ben-Hur – A Tale of the Christ (1925) by Fred Niblo with Ramon Novarro
 The Cat and the Canary (1927) by Paul Leni
 The General (1926) with Buster Keaton
 Our Hospitality (1923) with Buster Keaton
 Speedy (1928) directed by Ted Wilde starring Harold Lloyd
 The Kid Brother (1927) directed by Ted Wilde starring Harold Lloyd
 Safety Last! (1923) directed by Fred C. Newmeyer and Sam Taylor starring Harold Lloyd
 Girl Shy (1924) directed by Fred C. Newmeyer and Sam Taylor starring Harold Lloyd
 Hot Water (1924) directed by Fred C. Newmeyer starring Harold Lloyd
 The Phantom of the Opera (1925) directed by Rupert Julian with Lon Chaney
 The Hunchback of Notre Dame (1923) directed by Wallace Worsley with Lon Chaney
 Heart o' the Hills (1919) directed by Sidney Franklin starring Mary Pickford and John Gilbert
 Mare Nostrum (1926) directed by Rex Ingram starring Alice Terry and Antonio Moreno
 The Wicked Darling (1919) directed by Tod Browning with Lon Chaney and Priscilla Dean
 The Strong Man (1927) directed by Frank Capra starring Harry Langdon
 Broken Blossoms (1919) directed by D. W. Griffith starring Lillian Gish and Richard Barthelmess
 Intolerance (1916) directed by D. W. Griffith starring Lillian Gish, Robert Harron and Constance Talmadge

Shorts
 The Adventures of Dollie (1908) directed by D. W. Griffith starring Lillian and Dorothy Gish
 The Immigrant (1917) directed by Charles Chaplin
 One Week (1920) starring Buster Keaton
 Get Out and Get Under (1920) directed by Hal Roach with Harold Lloyd
 Giving Them Fits (1915) directed by Hal Roach with Harold Lloyd
 Sword Points (1928) directed by Mark Sandrich starring Lupino Lane

Academy recognition
In 2010 Photoplay Director Kevin Brownlow was awarded an honorary Oscar for his services to cinema in the role of film historian and film restorer.

References

External links
 IMDB 
 Photoplay Productions – Facebook Page
 Photoplay Productions – Website 

Film production companies of the United Kingdom